"Champion" is a single by Danish rapper, singer, music writer, actor Clemens, Hedegaard and Jon Nørgaard. It was released in Denmark as a digital download on 27 December 2011. The song has so far peaked to number 14 on the Danish Singles Chart.

Track listing
Digital download
 "Vi Ejer Natten" - 3:33

Chart performance

Release history

References

2011 singles
Jon Nørgaard songs
2011 songs
Song articles with missing songwriters